Crişeni may refer to several places:

Crișeni, a commune in Sălaj County
Crişeni, a village in Vințu de Jos Commune, Alba County
Crişeni, a village in Mociu Commune, Cluj County
Crişeni, a village in Atid Commune, Harghita County
Crişeni, a village in Craidorolț Commune, Satu Mare County

See also 
 Criș (disambiguation)
 Crișana (disambiguation)